Siboniso Master Cele (born 23 March 1985 in Pietermaritzburg) is a South African slalom canoeist who competed at the international level from 2003 to 2010. He was eliminated in the qualifying round of the C1 event at the 2008 Summer Olympics in Beijing, finishing in 16th place.

World Cup individual podiums

1 African Championship counting for World Cup points

References

1985 births
Sportspeople from Pietermaritzburg
Canoeists at the 2008 Summer Olympics
Living people
Olympic canoeists of South Africa
South African male canoeists